The Bear Cove ferry terminal is a northern Vancouver Island ferry port in British Columbia, Canada. The location on the Queen Charlotte Strait, near the district municipality of Port Hardy in the Regional District of Mount Waddington, provides connections to British Columbia's Central and Northern coasts. The ferry terminal is the northern terminus of Highway 19.

Construction
In 1979, the new $2.5M new terminal opened. The relocation from Kelsey Bay reduced the Prince Rupert run by four hours.

Routes
BC Ferries (British Columbia Ferry Services Inc.), the main provider of BC coastal ferry services, operates the following routes:

 Route 10 – Inside Passage: Port Hardy to Prince Rupert (summer stops at Bella Bella and Klemtu).
 Route 28 – Discovery Coast Connector (summer only): Port Hardy to Bella Coola (with stops at Bella Bella, Shearwater, Klemtu, and Ocean Falls).

See also
 Inside Passage

References

External links
 BC Ferries: Routes & Schedules

BC Ferries
Ferry terminals in British Columbia